This is a list of the royal consorts of the rulers of Bohemia.

The first Duchess of Bohemia (česká kněžna) was St. Ludmila, while the first Queen of Bohemia (česká královna) was Świętosława of Poland. Some of them were (like their husbands) not crowned.

There was only one queen regnant in Czech history - Maria Theresa. Nevertheless, some female royal consorts were highly influential in the country's history, having ruled as regents for their minor children and heirs, as well as having a great influence over their spouses.

The title was used until 1918, when husband of the last queen was deposed.

House of Přemysl

Duchesses of Bohemia
 874–888/891: Ludmila of Bohemia (Svatá Ludmila), wife of Bořivoj I, d. assassinated 15 September 921 in Tetín Castle
 906–921: Drahomíra (princess Drahomíra ze Stodor), wife of Vratislav I, d. after 935
 935–972: Biagota, wife of Boleslav I
 ?–999: Emma of Melnik (Emma Regina or Hemma princess of Burgundy), original evident Queen of France, widow from King Lothair of France (d. 986), circa 989 second wife  of Boleslaus I, d. 1005/1006
 ?–?: Božena (Křesinova), second morganatic wife of duke Oldřich
 1034–1055: Judith of Schweinfurt (Jitka ze Svinibrodu/ Babenberská), (from House of Babenberg), wife of Bretislaus I, d. 1058
 1055–1061: Ida of Wettin (Ida Wettinská), wife of Spytihněv II, d. a. 1061
 1061–1062: Adelaide of Hungary (Adléta Uherská), first wife of Vratislaus II, d. 1062

 1092: Wirpirk of Tengling (Virpirka z Tenglingu), wife of Konrád I Brněnský
 1094–1100: Lukarta of Bogen (Lukarta z Bogenu), wife of Břetislav II
 1100–1007: Helbirga of Austria (Helbirga Babenberská), wife of Bořivoj II, d. 1142
 1111–1117: Richeza of Berg (Richenza z Bergu), wife of Vladislav I, d. 1125
 1117–1120: Helbirga of Austria (Helbirga Babenberská), wife of Bořivoj II, d. 1142
 1120–1125: Richeza of Berg (Richenza z Bergu), wife of Vladislav I, d. 1125
 1125–1140: Adelaide of Hungary (Adleyta Arpádovna), wife of Soběslav I, d. 1140
 1140–1150: Gertrude of Babenberg (Gertruda Babenberská), first wife of Vladislaus II, d. 1150

 1172–1173: Elisabeth of Hungary (Alžběta Uherská), wife of Frederick I, d. after 1189
 1173/7–1178: Elisabeth of Poland (Eliška Polská), wife of Soběslav II, d. 1209
 1178–1189: Elisabeth of Hungary (Alžběta Uherská), wife of Frederick I, d. after 1189
 1189–1191: Hellicha of Wittelsbach (Hellicha z Wittelsbachu), wife of Konrád II Ota, d. after 1198

Queens of Bohemia

Non-dynastic

House of Luxemburg

Non-dynastic

House of Jagiellon, 1490–1526

House of Habsburg

House of Wittelsbach

House of Habsburg

House of Wittelsbach

House of Habsburg-Lorraine

See also
 List of the Czechoslovak and Czech First Ladies

royal consorts
 
 
Bohemia, Royal Consorts
Bohemia, Royal Consorts
Bohemia